The Unfortunate Car is a 2012 Chinese romantic comedy film directed by Hua Yuan and Bao Jiming, and written by Huayuan and Yin Guojun. The film stars Guo Degang, Viann Zhang, Ambrose Hui, and Wang Yi'nan. It was released in China on April Fools' Day.

Plot

Cast
 Guo Degang as Guo Lihang, a stingy rich merchant.
 Viann Zhang as Yi Rong, a white-collar.
 Ambrose Hui as Chen Bo, a petty bourgeoisie.
 Wang Yi'nan as Yan Xiaolian, a single mother.

Other
 Pan Changjiang as one of the pyramid selling leader.
 Qu Ying as one of the pyramid selling leader.
 Yu Qian as the Manager Hu.

Production
The film began production on June 17, 2011, and finished filming on July 14, 2011.

Reception

Critical response 
The film received negative reviews.

Box office
The film grossed ￥20 million on its first weekend.

References

External links
 
 

2012 films
2010s Mandarin-language films
Chinese romantic comedy films
2012 romantic comedy films